Beaufort-Hyde News was a weekly newspaper based in Belhaven, North Carolina. The Coastal Observer was merged into the Beaufort-Hyde News in 1990.

Cox Newspapers sold the paper to Cooke Communications in 2009. The paper closed in 2013.

References

Weekly newspapers published in North Carolina
Beaufort County, North Carolina